Neunkirchen-Seelscheid is a municipality in the Rhein-Sieg district in the southern part of North Rhine-Westphalia, Germany. Beside the two principal places Neunkirchen and Seelscheid there are numerous smaller localities among the municipality.

Geography

Neunkirchen-Seelscheid is located 20 km north-east of Bonn and 25 km south-east from Cologne in the southern part of the region of Berg (Bergisches Land). The northwest municipality border is formed by the river course of the Naafbach, while the Bröl acts as the southeast border. The Wahnbach flows through the municipality.

Neighbour municipalities

Neighbouring cities are Siegburg, Hennef, Overath and Lohmar.
Neighbouring municipalities are Much and Ruppichteroth.

Subdivisions

Beside the two principal places Neunkirchen (5423) and Seelscheid (5788) there are following localities within the municipality (population between brackets)

Balensiefen (20), Birken (58), Birkenfeld (174), Birkenmühle (5), Brackemich (106), Breiderheide (3), Breitscheid, Bruchhausen (59), Busch (14), Effert (2), Eich (101), Eischeid (508), Gutmühle (39), Hardt (43), Hasenbach (315), Hausen, Hausermühle (71), Heidgen, Heister (110), Herkenrath (137), Hermerath (342), Hermerather Mühle, Herrenwiesermühle, Hochhausen (397), Hohn (101), Höfferhof, Hülscheid (418), Ingersau (62), Ingersaueler Mühle (6), Kaule (37), Kotthausen, Köbach (112), Krahwinkel (200), Meisenbach, Mohlscheid (383), Nackhausen (319), Niederhorbach (164), Niederwennerscheid (507), Oberdorst (364), Oberheister (413), Oberhorbach (64), Oberste Zeith, Oberwennerscheid (432), Ohlig (10), Ohmerath (31), Pinn (45), Pixhof, Pohlhausen (492), Rehwiese (6), Remschoß (254), Rengert (222), Renzert (64), Rippert (128), Schaaren, Scherpekotten (2), Scherpemich, Schöneshof (454), Siefen (34), Söntgerath (134), Stein (125), Steinermühle (19), Straßen (84), Unterste Zeith, Wahlen (22), Wahn (197), Weiert (32), Wende (4), Weesbach, Wiescheid, Wolperath (1288)

Population

1998 – 19.515
1999 – 19.874
2000 – 20.079
2001 – 20.328
2002 – 20.674
2003 – 20.898
2004 – 21.020
2005 – 21.000
2006 – 20.946
2007 – 20.902
2008 – 20.868
2009 – 20.855
2010 – 20.822
2011 - 20.756
2012 – 20.613
2013 – 20.497
2014 – 20.593
2015 – 20.958
2016 – 20.158
2017 - 19.758

History
 ca. 5000 BC - first remains of human settlement
 1178 - first documentary mention
 1969 Neunkirchen-Seelscheid were made of the two old municipalities Neunkirchen and Seelscheid

Politics
The 40 seats of the municipal council are distributed as follows since the September 2020 elections:

 CDU - 16 seats
 SPD - 11 seats
 The Greens - 9 seats
 FDP - 2 seats
 Wir für Neunkirchen-Seelscheid - 1 seat
 Demokratie durch Volksabstimmung - 1 seat

Twin towns
  Bicester, Oxfordshire in Great Britain
  Les Essarts, Vendée in France
  Czernichów in Poland

Notable people 
 Andreas Pinkwart (born 1960), German politician (FDP)

References

External links
 Bürgermeisterin
 1. Stellvertretender Bürgermeister
 2. Stellvertretende Bürgermeisterin
 Nachrichten aus der Region
 Fraktionen und Sitzverteilung im Gemeinderat
 Hersteller von Pokalen in der Region
 Altersverteilung und Einwohnerzahlen